The Revenue Mobilization Allocation and Fiscal Commission is an agency of the Federal Republic of Nigeria that oversees the revenues accruing to and disbursement of such funds from the Federal Account. The Body also ensures that there is conformity and equity in the nation's revenue allocation formulae.

History
The agency was set up by Decree No. 49 of 1989 which was later amended by Decree 98 of 1993 and is presently RMAFC Act CAP R7 LFN 2004 under Section 153(1) of the 1999 Constitution of the Federal Republic of Nigeria. The Commission is one of the fourteen agencies under the Federal Executive Council. The agency has a chairman and 35 members from each State of the Federation and the Federal Capital territory which are all appointed by the President.

Functions
The body is charged with reviewing the revenue allocation formula every five years, fixing the salary of political office holders, public officers as well as monitoring the inflow of revenues into the coffers of the nation and blocking leakages. The agency also plays an advisory role to the three tiers of government on fiscal efficiency and avenues through which they can increase revenue accruals. In 2021, the Commission initiated dialogues with government officials and stakeholders as a prelude to modifying the revenue sharing formula in Nigeria. In April 2022, the Commission presented the report to the President, Mohammed Buhari. The report proposed a sharing formula that slashes the allocation of funds to the federal government from 52.68 to 45.17 percent, an increase for States (from 26.72 to 29.79 percent) while the local governments are also projected to have an increase from 20.60 t0 21.04 percent.

The Commission carries out its duties primarily through the following Constitutional Committees namely; 
   
 Crude Oil Monitoring Committee
 Gas Monitoring Committee
 Indices and Disbursement Committee    
 Federation Account Committee
 Remuneration and Monetization Committee
 Mobilisation and Diversification Committee
 Fiscal efficiency and Budget Committee
 Investment Monitoring Committee
 Revenue Allocation Formula Committee
 Inland Revenue monitoring Committee
 Customs Revenue Monitoring Committee
 Solid Minerals Monitoring Committee
 Central Bank Monitoring Committee

Chairman and Members
On 26 June 2019, President Buhari swore in Elias Mbam as the Chairman of the Commission. He also swore in members from different States as follows;

In April 2022, Elias Mbam left the Commission to contest in the Ebonyi State gubernatorial primaries. Mohammed Bello was sworn as the new Chairman by the President on 16 August 2022.

Controversies
On 31 December 2021, the National Assembly passed the Finance Act. The agency went to court to seek clarifications as Section 68 of the Federal Inland Revenue Service (Establishment) Act 2007 which was amended by the Finance Act 2021, and Section 89 of the Stamp Duties Act as amended by the Finance Act (2021) as well as Section 4 of the Finance (Control and Management) Act as amended by the Finance Act (2021) appear to have infringed on the statutory functions of the agency. The court case was in view of the provisions of Section 153, 160, 162 and Paragraph 32 of Part 1 of the 3rd Schedule of the 1999 Constitution.

In July, 2022 a High Court in Abuja while receiving evidence on the corruption charges against the former Accountant general of the federation was told how derivation funds meant to be paid to nine oil producing States as part of the revenue accruing to them was diverted and shared to some persons including one of the members of RMAFC.

References 

Government agencies of Nigeria
Revenue services